The Across the Great Divide Tour was a live DVD and release by Australian rock bands Powderfinger and Silverchair. Released on 1 December 2007, it followed two Melbourne concerts during the bands' two-month-long nationwide tour, titled the Across the Great Divide tour. The DVD was produced by filming company PVC Live, who have produced DVD releases for U2, Red Hot Chili Peppers and Radiohead. It was mixed in the United States in 5.1 surround sound, and filmed with 24 cameras.

The DVD included a 90-minute documentary titled Behind the Great Divide, which followed the band members during the different concerts and events of the tour.

Awards and accreditations 
The DVD was ranked at number 13 on the ARIA's End-of-Year Charts for the Top 50 Music DVDs in 2007 and was also certified 2× platinum (over 30,000 units sold).

On 19 October 2008, the DVD won an award for Best Music DVD at the (22nd) Annual ARIA Music Awards put on by the Australian Recording Industry Association. They beat fellow nominees, Hilltop Hoods, Paul Kelly, John Butler, Wolfmother for the honour.

Track listing 
Disc one and two featured a gallery of photographs taken at the Melbourne performances.

Powderfinger show 
 "Head Up in the Clouds"
 "Waiting for the Sun"
 "Lost and Running"
 "Nobody Sees"
 "Love Your Way"
 "Thrilloilogy"
 "I Don't Remember"
 "Already Gone"
 "Who Really Cares (Featuring the Sound of Insanity)"
 "The Crux"
 "Black Tears"
 "These Days"
 "My Happiness"
 "Bless My Soul"
 "Sunsets"
 "(Baby I've Got You) On My Mind"
 "Substitute" – a track which both bands covered and performed, the original is by The Who.

Silverchair show 
 "Young Modern Station" (Young Modern)
 "Israel's Son" (Frogstomp)
 "Emotion Sickness" (Neon Ballroom)
 "Without You" (Diorama)
 "Reflections of a Sound" (Young Modern)
 "Insomnia" (Young Modern)
 "Ana's Song (Open Fire)" (Neon Ballroom)
 "Those Thieving Birds (Part 1)/Strange Behaviour/Those Thieving Birds (Part 2)" (Young Modern)
 "The Greatest View" (Diorama)
 "Luv Your Life" (Diorama)
 "Straight Lines" (Young Modern)
 "The Door" (Freak Show)
 "Mind Reader" (Young Modern)
 "If You Keep Losing Sleep" (Young Modern)
 "Freak" (Freak Show)
 "Substitute"

Documentary 
The documentary was titled Behind the Great Divide. Segments included were:

 "Two Bands"
 "Hello Newcastle"
 "This Is Very Exciting Stuff"
 "You Might Need the Wide Lens"
 "Shambolic Jam"
 "A Four Nugget Experience"
 "Curse Your Stormy Weather"
 "Jake You Took Us the Long Way"
 "That's My Favourite Tambourine"
 "They Were So Much Better Than Shelbyville"
 "Bye Everyone, Thanks for Coming"
 "That Will Never Make the DVD"

Personnel

Silverchair 
 Daniel Johns – vocals, guitars
 Ben Gillies – drums, percussion
 Chris Joannou – bass guitar

Additional musicians 
 Paul Mac – keyboards
 Adam Sofo – keyboards

Powderfinger 
 Bernard Fanning – vocals, keyboards, guitars
 Darren Middleton – guitars, backing vocals
 Ian Haug – guitars, backing vocals
 John Collins – bass guitar
 Jon Coghill – drums, percussion

Additional musicians 
 Lachlan Doley – keyboards

Behind the Great Divide 

 Jade Skelly – producer and director
 James Hackett – executive producer

DVD production 

 Cameron Barnett – director
 Peter Fowler – director
 Victoria Conners-Bell – producer

References

External links 
 Official tour website
 PVC Live

ARIA Award-winning albums
Powderfinger video albums
Silverchair video albums
2007 video albums
Collaborative albums
Live video albums
2007 live albums